János Pintér (28 November 1936 – 14 September 2021) was a Hungarian long-distance runner who competed in the 1964 Summer Olympics. Pintér was born in Budapest on 28 November 1936. He died on 14 September 2021, at the age of 84.

References

1936 births
2021 deaths
Hungarian male long-distance runners
Olympic athletes of Hungary
Athletes (track and field) at the 1964 Summer Olympics
Athletes from Budapest
Universiade medalists in athletics (track and field)
Universiade gold medalists for Hungary
Medalists at the 1961 Summer Universiade
20th-century Hungarian people
21st-century Hungarian people